Lis Cuesta Peraza (born March 28, 1971) is a Cuban politician and former tourism executive. She is the current First Lady of Cuba as the second wife of Miguel Díaz-Canel, the First Secretary of the Communist Party and President of Cuba. Cuesta is the first woman to be called "first lady" by Cuban state-run media since the 1960s.

References

First ladies of Cuba
21st-century Cuban women politicians
Cuban businesspeople
1971 births
Living people